Ober Mountain Adventure Park & Ski Area, formerly known as Ober Gatlinburg, is a ski area and amusement park located in Gatlinburg, Tennessee, USA that was established in 1962. The area also contains a large mall with indoor amusements, an indoor ice skating rink, snack bars, a restaurant, and stores. An aerial tram connects Ober Mountain, to downtown Gatlinburg, about 3 miles east.

History 
The ski area opened in 1962 as Gatlinburg Ski Resort. In 1973, Claude Anders opened the Gatlinburg Aerial Tramway. In 1974, the Gatlinburg Ski Resort began to go out of business due to publicity from a bad lift accident. It was bought the Anders Family in 1975 and merged with the Gatlinburg Aerial Tramway. In 1977, it was renamed Ober Gatlinburg, which is German for "Upper Gatlinburg" or "Top of Gatlinburg."

The upper mall opened in 1982.

Snow tubing was added to the resort in 2008.

In 2012, the resort installed a snowmaking system, which allows them to open earlier in the season, before natural snow occurs. In 2017, it upgraded the snowmaking system, particularly focusing on Cub Way.

In 2022, the resort was sold to new owners, who renamed the resort from "Ober Gatlinburg" to "Ober Mountain Adventure Park & Ski Area."

Slopes 

A multi-lane snow tubing hill opened during the 2008-2009 ski season, where riders can slide down snow chutes on inflatable snow tubes. The tubing hill is serviced by a magic carpet, as is the ski school slope.

Lifts 
The Scenic Chairlift is a double lift that runs to the summit of Mount Harrison, where there is a scenic overlook. It was built in 1962 and the drive system and chairs were upgraded in 2014.

The Blue Lift is also a double lift that terminates at the Alpine Way slope and the alpine slide.

Ober Mountain has two quad lifts, the Red Lift and the Black Lift. The Red Lift offers access to Cub Way and Castle Run. The Black Lift offers access to Yeti's Run, Ober Chute, Upper and Lower Bear, Mogul Ridge, and Grizzly.

Aerial Tramway 
The aerial tramway departs from downtown Gatlinburg and travels west to the resort. The system was built in 1973 by Von Roll Ltd. and has two 120-passenger cabins. They were replaced by Doppelmayr in 2007. The  tram ride runs  and takes about 10 minutes.

Amusement park
The amusement park part of Ober Mountain is open year-round. One of the main attractions is the Wildlife Encounter, where in addition to black bears there are animals native to the Great Smoky Mountains. Other attractions include: an alpine slide, the Ski Mountain Coaster, hiking trails, indoor ice skating plus ice bumper cars, miniature golf, water raft rides (summer only), an outdoor maze, a rock climbing wall, and a carousel.

References

External links

Ober Mountain homepage
Ober Mountain Tramway

1962 establishments in Tennessee
Buildings and structures in Sevier County, Tennessee
Amusement parks in Tennessee
Ski areas and resorts in Tennessee
Tourist attractions in Sevier County, Tennessee
Gatlinburg, Tennessee
Amusement parks opened in 1962
Aerial tramways in the United States